Brian Panowich is an American author and journalist.

Biography
Panowich grew up an "Army brat" in Europe before moving to East Georgia. Before becoming a writer he was a firefighter in Augusta, Georgia.

He wrote the novels Bull Mountain, Like Lions, and Hard Cash Valley. 

Panowich won the 2016 International Thriller Writers Award for the best first novel and the Pat Conroy Southern Book Prize for the best crime novel. He is also a LA Times Book Prize finalist and the 2020 Georgia Author of the year. 

In 2015 ITV Studios optioned Bull Mountain for adaptation into a TV series. El País called his work about adventures in the mountains of Georgia "Country Noir". Il Giornale also wrote about his work. The Huffington Post interviewed him in 2015. Atlanta Magazine called Bull Mountain a brilliant debut novel. 

Panowich has four children.

Books 
 Bull Mountain (2015)
 Like Lions (2019)
 Hard Cash Valley (2020)

References

Living people
American fiction writers
Writers from Georgia (U.S. state)
Year of birth missing (living people)